The 1980–81 Wisconsin Badgers men's ice hockey team represented the University of Wisconsin–Madison in college ice hockey. In its fourteenth year under head coach Bob Johnson, the team compiled a 27–14–1 record (17–11 against Western Collegiate Hockey Association (WCHA) opponents) and outscored all opponents 218 to 155. The Badgers were the recipients of an at-large bid in the first year that the NCAA guaranteed 8 teams entry into the postseason tournament and in doing so became the first team to win a national championship because of the expanded format.

Season
Wisconsin began the 1980–81 season fresh after compiling its first losing season since returning to NCAA play in 1963. With little expectation for the '81 campaign Bob Johnson's Badgers got off to a fast start, going 7-1 in the first month of the season before embarking on a .500 skid in early November. The Badgers would lose a game in every weekend series until after Christmas when they finally managed to take both games against a mediocre Yale squad, only to lose both games to Rensselaer the following week. Wisconsin was hampered by high-scoring freshman and future NHL-er Bruce Eakin leaving the program after only four games and heading to the WHL.

From January 1 onward, Wisconsin managed to just post a winning record, going 10-8 over that stretch but still finishing in a tie for second in conference standings on the strength of their early-season success. The Badgers won the tie-breaker over Michigan Tech and were seeded second in the WCHA Tournament. After winning their first game against Colorado College 8-2 it appeared Wisconsin was set for an appearance in second round until the Tigers roared back with an 11-4 win in the second game and upset a stunned Badger team 13-12 in the series.

Ordinarily that would have been the end of the Wisconsin's season but in the summer of 1980 the NCAA changed its tournament format. With the success of the CCHA and the increasing number of programs at the Division I level the NCAA tournament was expanded to 8 teams, 4 for eastern schools and 4 for western squads. As tournament co-champions Minnesota and Michigan Tech received automatic bids, as did CCHA champion Northern Michigan. That left one spot open for a western school. Due to the feeling at the time that the CCHA was a 'lesser' conference the 24-12-3 record of second place Ohio State was seen as inferior to anything the WCHA could offer and the Buckeyes were passed over. While the Badgers did lose in the first round Denver, who had finished only two points behind Wisconsin, had also lost their first round matchup and the team that had defeated them, Michigan, were soundly beaten by Michigan Tech in the Second round 9-2. With no team standing out from the rest the tournament committee settled on awarding the final spot to Wisconsin.

Wisconsin opened the 1981 Tournament in front a hostile crowd in Potsdam, NY as they faced the top eastern seed Clarkson. Miraculously the Badgers managed to take the first game 3-2 but, just as the WCHA tournament had been, the NCAA first round was a 2-game total-goal series and 1 score was a very slim margin to hold. The second game was a much more explosive affair with both teams notching six goals in regulation play. Because of a peculiarity with the series Wisconsin leading 9-8 after regulation didn't end the matchup and the two would play one overtime session to see if the 'winner' of the game could be determined. If Wisconsin scored the series would be over immediately, however, if Clarkson scored the game would continue because the series had been tied at 9-9 despite an overtime marker. Neither of those events came to pass and both teams failed to score in the overtime session, allowing the game to finish in a tie and the Badgers to progress to the Frozen Four.

In their first game at the Duluth Arena the Badgers faced Northern Michigan, the first time the two teams played one another. Both squads played a scoreless first period before Ed Lebler opened the scoring three minutes into the second. Two more Badgers scored before the Wildcats could get their first goal of the game but Marc Behrend made sure that was all they could earn, turning away their 25 other shots en route to a 5-1 win. In the final Wisconsin was set against #1 overall seed Minnesota who possessed the top offense in the nation boasting both the NCAA scoring champion Aaron Broten and the first Hobey Baker Award winner Neal Broten. The Golden Gophers had taken three out of four contests against the Badgers that season, out-pacing Johnson's team 27 goals to 14. None of that seemed to affect Wisconsin in the slightest as it was the Badgers who opened the scoring half way through the first period and never looked back. Wisconsin got the game's first four goals and by the time Minnesota had found the back of the net it was too late. The 'Back Door' Badgers fired 42 shots on goal, not letting up even with a 5-1 lead after two periods. Marc Behrend turned aside 30 of 33 shots in the contest and finished the tournament with a .932 save percentage in the Frozen Four, earning Tournament MOP honors. Despite the spectacular Frozen Four John Newbery was the only Badger other than Behrend to make the All-Tournament Team but the Wisconsin faithful were too overjoyed from the unexpected championship to mind.

No Wisconsin player was named as an AHCA All-American and only Theran Welsh was named to the Second Team All-WCHA.

Standings

Schedule
During the season, Wisconsin compiled a 27–14–1 record. Its schedule was as follows.

* Denotes overtime periods† WCHA game‡ Big Ten and WCHA game

National championship

(W1) Minnesota vs. (W4) Wisconsin

Roster and scoring statistics

Goaltending Statistics

Players drafted into the NHL

1981 NHL Entry Draft

See also
1981 NCAA Division I Men's Ice Hockey Tournament
List of NCAA Division I Men's Ice Hockey Tournament champions

References

Wisconsin Badgers men's ice hockey seasons
Wisconsin
Wisconsin
Wisconsin
Wisconsin
Wisconsin
Wisconsin